The Reverend Francis Charles Robert Jourdain M.A., F.Z.S., M.B.O.U. (4 March 1865 – 27 February 1940), was a notable British amateur ornithologist and oologist.  He was primarily known for his extensive research into the breeding biology of the birds of the Palaearctic region. He also had interests in the food of British birds and their geographical distribution and strongly encouraged detailed and accurate record keeping in local ornithology. Known for his temper, he came be known by the nickname Pastor Pugnax. He was a founder of the British Oological Association, which changed its name after his death to the Jourdain Society in his memory.

Early years
Jourdain was born in Ashbourne, Derbyshire, the eldest son of Rev. Francis Jourdain, vicar of Ashbourne-cum-Mapleton. He matriculated at Magdalen College, Oxford in 1883, he graduated B.A. in 1887. Ordained in 1890, he had two curacies in Suffolk, and then was appointed vicar of Clifton-by-Ashbourne in 1894.  In 1914 he was appointed rector of Appleton, near Abingdon-on-Thames, where he stayed until he retired in 1925.

Ornithology
He did not publish his first ornithological paper until 1899. From 1900 he went on an ornithological expedition abroad almost every year until his death, which resulted in a number of papers on the birds of the countries he visited.  While at Appleton he actively encouraged ornithological study at Oxford University, welcoming interested students to his home. In 1922 he founded the Oxford Ornithological Society and was president until his retirement in 1925. This society led in later years to the formation of the British Trust for Ornithology and the Edward Grey Institute of Field Ornithology. He organized and led the Oxford University Spitsbergen Expedition in 1921.

Jourdain produced several ornithological papers, although many were started but never finished, and authored or contributed to a number of books, notably the sections on Breeding-habits, Distribution Abroad and Food in the Handbook of British Birds (1938–41).  He was assistant editor of British Birds, the "illustrated (monthly) magazine devoted to the birds on the British list", from 1909 onwards (until his death in 1940). He was also assistant editor of The Ibis from 1931 onwards and co-editor of The Oologists Record from 1935 onwards.  He joined the British Ornithologists' Union in 1899, serving on the committee including as vice-President in 1934, joined the British Ornithologists' Club in 1905, was a member of the British List Committee for many years and was a founding member of the British Oological Association, of which he was president from 1932–39.  He was also a member of the International Ornithological Committee, an Honorary Fellow of the American Ornithologists' Union and an Honorary Member of the ornithological societies of France, Germany, Holland and Hungary.

He led the first Oxford University Expedition to Spitzbergen and travelled extensively in Europe and North Africa. He served as President of the Oxford Ornithological Society and was associated with many other ornithological bodies.

Jourdain gained a reputation for his temper and went by the nickname of Pastor Pugnax. He retired in 1925, initially to Norfolk and then to Southbourne in Bournemouth two years later. He continued active field ornithology, writing and regularly attending ornithological gatherings right up until his death.

Jourdain died in Southbourne on 27 February 1940.

Publications
In addition to many ornithological papers, books he authored or coauthored include:

.online

 Witherby, H.F.; Jourdain, F.C.R.; Ticehurst, Norman F.; & Tucker, Bernard W. (1938–1941). The Handbook of British Birds. Vols.1–5. H.F. & G. Witherby Ltd: London.

Expeditions
1900	North Brabant, Netherlands
1901	North Holland (and Texel)
1902	Netherlands
1903	Jutland
1904	Netherlands
1905/06/07	Southern Spain
1907	Morocco
1908/09	Corsica
1910/11	Dobrogea, E. Rumania
1912	S.W. Iceland
1913/14	Eastern Algeria
1915/19	Southern Spain
1920	Morocco
1921/22	Norway and Spitzbergen
1923	Netherlands, Haute Savoie and Switzerland
1924	Norway and Finland
1925	Tunisia and the Camargue
1926	Tunisia, Netherlands and Denmark
1927	Algeria
1928	Algeria and Marocco
1929	Cyprus
1930	Balearic Islands and the Netherlands
1931	Cyprus and Palestine
1932	Scotland
1933	Switzerland and Haute Savoie
1934	Wales
1935	Egypt and Palestine
1936	Hungary
1937	Corsica
1938	France
1939	Scotland and Shetland

References

 Manuscript and Drawing Collection of Francis Charles Robert Jourdain (1865–1940). A Collection Description. Natural History Museum: London.  Accessed 15 December 2006.
 Tucker, B.W., 1940. Francis Charles Robert Jourdain: An Appreciation. The Ibis. 1940. 504–518
 Witherby, H.F., 1940. Obituary: The Rev. F. C. R. Jourdain. (1865–1940). British Birds, 33(11), pp. 286–293

External links

English ornithologists
Members of British Ornithologists' Union
Fellows of the Zoological Society of London
1865 births
1940 deaths
Zoological collectors
Egg collectors
People from Ashbourne, Derbyshire
Alumni of Magdalen College, Oxford
Oologists